Cobham Free School is an all-through mixed free school which has two sites in Cobham, Elmbridge, Surrey, England.

History and sites
The school opened in 2012 and educates students aged 4–18 years. The primary department occupies the site of the former Cobham police station, which it moved to in 2013. Cobham Free School Senior Department and Sixth Form are both based in Munro House, the permanent main site for the school. The Senior Department was temporarily located at a former primary school site in West Molesey. The move to Munro House occurred at the start of the 2020/21 school year.

Ofsted
In May 2014, the school had its first Ofsted inspection, when the school was adjudged to be "Good". The inspectors noted that the headteacher has an inspiring vision for the school which the whole school community is fully behind. In the 2017 following Ofsted inspection the school was again rated "Good".

References

External links 
 Cobham Free School official site

Secondary schools in Surrey
Educational institutions established in 2012
2012 establishments in England
Free schools in England
Borough of Elmbridge
Primary schools in Surrey